Brazil is a union of 27 federative units (Portuguese: unidades federativas): 26 states (estados) and one federal district (distrito federal). Each of these units has designated an official state bird, which are listed below.

List

References
"A Ave Símbolo de Cada Estado". Ornithos. (2017). Retrieved December 21, 2017.

 
Birds
Birds
Brazil
Brazil